Heybat-e Sofla (also Romanized as Heybat-e Soflá; also known as Heybat-e Pā’īn) is a village in Angut-e Gharbi Rural District, Anguti District, Germi County, Ardabil Province, Iran. At the 2006 census, its population was 33, in 8 families.

References 

Towns and villages in Germi County